Paul Leicester Ford (March 23, 1865 – May 8, 1902) was an American novelist and biographer, born in Brooklyn, the son of Gordon Lester Ford and Emily Fowler Ford (a granddaughter of Noah Webster and lifelong friend of Emily Dickinson).

Life and work

Ford was the great-grandson of Noah Webster and the brother of historian Worthington C. Ford. He wrote of the lives of George Washington, Benjamin Franklin, and others, edited the works of Thomas Jefferson, and wrote a number of novels which had considerable success, including The Honorable Peter Stirling, Story of an Untold Love, Janice Meredith, Wanted a Matchmaker, and Wanted a Chaperon.

Ford's edition of The Writings of Thomas Jefferson is still regarded as one of the monuments of American historical scholarship, setting the standard for documentary editing for half a century until the appearance of the first volume of The Papers of Thomas Jefferson, edited by Julian P. Boyd. Ford's edition remains valuable for its accuracy of transcription from original manuscripts and its careful annotation of the documents chosen for publication. The Ford edition appeared in two versions, a 10 volume edition published between 1892 and 1896 and a 14 volume limited numbered edition issued in 1904, known as the "Federal" edition.

Ford was murdered in his Manhattan home by his brother Malcolm Webster Ford, at one time the most famous amateur athlete in the United States, who then committed suicide. He is interred at Sleepy Hollow Cemetery in Sleepy Hollow, New York.

Works
 The works of Thomas Jefferson (1904-1905)
 The True George Washington (1907)
 The Many-sided Franklin (1899)
 The Honorable Peter Stirling (1894)
 Story of an Untold Love (1897)
 Story of an Untold Love New York: Dodd, Mead and Co., 1897
 Janice Meredith (1899)
 Wanted a Matchmaker (1901)
 Wanted a Chaperon (1902)

References

External links
 "Paul L. Ford's Career" -- The New York Times 1902
 
 
 
 
 Paul Leicester Ford Papers. Yale Collection of American Literature, Beinecke Rare Book and Manuscript Library.

1865 births
1902 deaths
19th-century American male writers
19th-century American novelists
American biographers
American male novelists
Burials at Sleepy Hollow Cemetery
Deaths by firearm in Manhattan
Historians from New York (state)
American male biographers
Novelists from New York (state)
People from Marlborough, New Hampshire
People murdered in New York City
Male murder victims
Writers from Brooklyn
Members of the American Academy of Arts and Letters